An electric tug is a battery-powered and pedestrian-operated machine used to move heavy loads on wheels.

The machines form part of the material-handling equipment field that, amongst others, also covers forklift trucks, overhead cranes and pallet jacks.

Although electric tug is perhaps the most commonly used term, suppliers and customers regularly use a range of other names, such as towing tractor, battery-powered tug, electric hand truck, electric tugger and pedestrian-operated tug.

The tugs move loads across a single level. They do not lift the load clear of the ground which is why the load must be on wheels. If the load itself does not have wheels, it would be placed on a wheeled platform often referred to as a trolley, bogie or skate. The tug connects to this wheeled platform just as a forklift truck picks up a pallet to move a load placed on it.

In most cases a steel coupling (male) attached to the machine itself connects to a corresponding coupling (female) bolted to the load's bogie. A second bogie or multiple bogies will each have identical female couplings attached to them so that a single male coupling attached to the machine can move them all without alterations.

Operation

An electric tug relies on the principal of tractive effort. The machine, once secured to the bogie, will lift a portion of the load ensuring the load's wheels remain on the ground. This is achieved via the machine's hydraulic mast which is designed to create downforce on the drive wheel immediately beneath it. It is the traction generated from this process that allows the tug to move very large and heavy objects. As a tug does not lift its load clear of the ground, it does not have to conform to the Lifting Operations and Lifting Equipment Regulations 1998 (LOLER); therefore, an operator does not need a licence to operate it.

Applications
Electric tugs are used in many work sectors. Some common applications include:

RetailTo move heavy roll cages from a delivery vehicle's tail lift to the supermarket's storeroom or long trains of empty roll cages.
Healthcareto move bariatric beds, waste bins (including multiple bins at once), linen cages and gas bottles.
Pharmaceuticalto move chromatography columns within laboratories.
Supermarkets and airportsto move long trains of empty luggage trolleys.
Horticulture and agricultureto move heavy materials such as top soil or to harvest crops in polytunnels.
ConstructionTo move heavy building materials or to access construction sites where diggers and movers cannot due to size restrictions. 
Food and beverageto move large, heavy mixing bowls full of product.
Waste handling - to move containers and waste bins and wheelie bins.
Manufacturing and assembly:
Automotive - To move heavy products such as vehicles down a production line.
GlassTo move heavy stillages used to hold glass through production.
Wind turbinesMoving turbine blades up to 50 metres in length through production.
AerospaceTo move wing assemblies, invar tooling, turnover jigs etc.
Boat buildingTo move luxury yachts on cradles through production.
Brick and ceramicTo move product into and out of a kiln.
Modular buildingsTo move buildings through production and completed buildings into storage.
Cable and wire reelsTo move unwieldy reels in production.
RailTo move loads mounted on rails, such as in railway maintenance depots.

References

Electric vehicles
Material-handling equipment
Industrial equipment